A by-election was held in the Sagaga-le-Usoga constituency in Samoa on 17 April 2015.

It followed the resignation of MP Muagututagata Peter Ah Him (of the governing Human Rights Protection Party, HRPP), who stepped down prior to being convicted for fraud. With the Opposition Tautua Samoa Party not standing a candidate, the HRPP fielded a choice of four candidates, and was certain to retain the seat.

Results
The results were as follows:

2011 results

References

By-elections to the Legislative Assembly of Samoa
2015 elections in Oceania
2015 in Samoa